Katherine Singer Kovács (July 26, 1946–May 12,1989) was an American film studies academic remembered for two long-standing book awards named in her honor.

Career

After being awarded a PhD from Harvard University in 1974 with the title Flaubert's Le rêve et la vie: a new theatrical conception, Kovacs worked at the University of Southern California and Whittier College. She was editor of the Quarterly Review of Film and Video up to her death from cancer in 1989.

Two awards were founded in her honour, the Katherine Singer Kovacs Prize award from the  Modern Language Association for the best book published in Latin American and Spanish Studies and the Katherine Singer Kovács Society for Cinema and Media Studies Book Award from the Society for Cinema and Media Studies  for the best book and article in film studies.

Selected works 
 Kovács, Katherine Singer. "Georges Méliès and the" Féerie"." Cinema Journal (1976): 1-13.
 Kovács, Katherine Singer. "Luis Buñuel and Pierre Louÿs: two visions of obscure objects." Cinema Journal (1979): 87–98.
 Kovács, Katherine Singer. "Gustave Flaubert and "Le rêve et la vie"." (1977).

References

Harvard University alumni
University of Southern California faculty
Whittier College faculty
1946 births
1989 deaths
Deaths from cancer